Lyubov Sergeyevna Zabolotskaya (born April 2, 1956 in the village of Sardyk of Kirov Oblast) is a former Soviet cross-country skier who competed during the early 1980s, being a member of the Soviet Team between 1978 and 1985. She won a silver medal in the 4 × 5 km relay at the 1982 FIS Nordic World Ski Championships in Oslo.

As a senior skier she competed for "Zenith" club of Moscow Oblast. She joined Soviet national team in 1978 at VI USSR National Winter Games. She never won gold of the Soviet National Championship, but she was the second in a 30 km race at the 1984 Soviet National Championship; several times she won bronze in 5 km and 10 km races in at 1981 and 1983. She was the absolute winner at Winter Universiade in 1981 and 1983. Zabolotskaya was also the winner of the 45th Prazdnik Severa in Murmansk. 

Since 1987 she works as a coach of the cross-country ski team  of the Moscow Institute of Physics and Technology.

Cross-country skiing results
All results are sourced from the International Ski Federation (FIS).

World Championships
 1 medal – (1 silver)

World Cup

Season standings

Team podiums

 1 podium

Note:   Until the 1999 World Championships, World Championship races were included in the World Cup scoring system.

References

External links

World Championship results 

Russian female cross-country skiers
Soviet female cross-country skiers
Academic staff of the Moscow Institute of Physics and Technology
Living people
FIS Nordic World Ski Championships medalists in cross-country skiing
Universiade medalists in cross-country skiing
Universiade gold medalists for the Soviet Union
Competitors at the 1983 Winter Universiade
1952 births